This list contains the names of persons (of any ethnicity or nationality) who wrote fiction, essays, or plays in the German language. It includes both living and deceased writers.

Most of the medieval authors are alphabetized by their first name, not by their sobriquet.

Abbreviations: children's (ch), drama (d), fiction (f), non-fiction (nf), poetry (p)

A

B

C

D

E

F

G

H

I

J

K

L

M

N

O

P

R

S

T

U

V

W

Y

Z

See also
List of German women writers
List of Austrian women writers
List of Swiss women writers
List of Germans
List of German journalists
List of German-language philosophers
List of German-language playwrights
List of German-language poets
Lists of writers

References

External links
Sophie, digital library of works by German-speaking women, Brigham Young University

German
 
German
Writers